Eugene Anderson (1927–2010) was an American trial lawyer.

Eugene Anderson may also refer to:

 Eugene Anderson (Kansas politician) (born 1944), Kansas state legislator
 E. N. Anderson (born 1941), American professor of anthropology
 Gene Anderson (wrestler) (1939–1991), American professional wrestler
 Gene Anderson (basketball) (1917–1999), American professional basketball player

See also
 Gene Anderson (disambiguation)
 Jean Anderson (disambiguation)
 Eugenie Anderson (1909–1997), United States diplomat